Raghuleela is a mall situated in Vashi, Navi Mumbai, India. Developed by Raghuleela Properties Pvt. The mall has daily footfall of up to 30,000 shoppers.

Anchor Tenants
Footin
Brand Factory
INOX – 6 screens Multiplex
Imperial Banquets
Food Courts & Theme Restaurants – KHPL( Village, Umrao Jaan, Coconut Groove)
Other tenants include – Kiah, Koutons, Woodlands, Peter England, Alen Paine, Cambridge etc.

Attached IT Park & Club House with Raghuleela Arcade
Area – 
KHPL - Cafeteria

References

Shopping malls in Mumbai
Navi Mumbai
Buildings and structures in Navi Mumbai
Economy of Navi Mumbai
Year of establishment missing